Jack Carroll (born 20 December 2002) is an Australian rules footballer who currently plays with the Carlton Football Club in the Australian Football League (AFL).

Originally from the Chapman Valley, near Geraldton in the Mid West region of Western Australia, in 2020 he moved to finish his schooling at Christian Brothers College, Fremantle and play for East Fremantle in the West Australian Football League colts.
He was drafted with the 41st selection in the 2021 AFL draft.

He made his AFL debut in the seventh round of the 2022 AFL season, where he kicked a goal with his first kick.

Notes

External links 

Living people
2002 births
Australian rules footballers from Western Australia
Carlton Football Club players